Here for the Party is the debut studio album by American country music singer Gretchen Wilson. It was released on May 11, 2004, by Epic Records Nashville. The album reached the top of the US country charts in May 2004 and number 2 on the Billboard 200 album charts.

Featured on the album is Wilson's breakthrough debut single, "Redneck Woman", a Number One hit on the Billboard Hot Country Singles & Tracks (now Hot Country Songs) charts. The tracks "Here for the Party", "When I Think About Cheatin'", and "Homewrecker" were also released as singles; these three singles all reached top 5 on the country charts as well.

The album received four Grammy nominations: Best New Artist, Best Country Album, Best Country Song ("Redneck Woman") and Best Female Country Vocal Performance ("Redneck Woman"). Gretchen Wilson won Best Female Country Vocal Performance.

Making of the album
Gretchen Wilson was singing in a bar when she met John Rich of Big & Rich, who invited her to work with him.  After some persistence, she agreed and joined the MuzikMafia, an informal group of Nashville singers and songwriters that gathered weekly to play songs.

Wilson signed with Epic Records in 2003 and went in the studio with producers Mark Wright and Joe Scaife and Rich as co-producer.  The first single, "Redneck Woman," was written as a tribute to women from small-town America.

Reception

"Redneck Woman" was released as a single in early 2004 and reached the top of the Billboard country singles charts and number 22 on the Billboard Hot 100.  The album was released in the U.S. on May 11, 2004.  It debuted at the top of the country album charts and at number two on the Billboard 200 with 227,000 copies sold.  Here for the Party was the fifth best selling album of 2004, with about 2.9 million copies sold.

Track listing

Musicians
Compiled from liner notes.
Musicians
Al Anderson – gut string guitar
Big Kenny – background vocals
Mike Brignardello – bass guitar, baritone guitar
Tom Bukovac – electric guitar
Eric Darken – percussion
Larry Franklin – fiddle, mandolin
Kenny Greenberg – electric guitar
Wes Hightower – background vocals
Greg Morrow – drums, percussion
Steve Nathan – piano, Hammond B-3 organ
Russ Pahl – pedal steel guitar, lap steel guitar, banjo
Angela Primm – background vocals
Michael Rhodes – bass guitar, baritone guitar
John Rich – acoustic guitar, background vocals 
Patrick Reilly - bass guitar 

Joe Scaife – background vocals
Trez – background vocals
Gale West – background vocals
John Willis – acoustic guitar
Payr
Gretchen Wilson – lead vocals, background vocals
Reese Wynans – piano, Hammond B-3 organ

Chart performances

Weekly charts

Year-end charts

Certifications

References

2004 debut albums
Epic Records albums
Gretchen Wilson albums
Albums produced by Mark Wright (record producer)